Dominique Rolin (22 May 1913 – 15 May 2012) was a Belgian novelist.

Dominique Rolin was a granddaughter of Léon Cladel. Her career was launched by Jean Cocteau and Jean Paulhan during the Second World War. Over some sixty years she developed a unique, feminist voice in French novel-writing, blending seamlessly autobiography and fiction, and centered on two men, her first husband, a sculptor, and avant-garde writer and theorist Philippe Sollers with whom, in spite of an age gap, she had a half-century secret relationship. She was a Femina Prize winner and a member of the Belgian Royal Academy.

Works
 Repas de famille (1932), novella
 Les Pieds d’argile (1935), novel
 La Peur (1936), novella
 Marais (1942),
 Anne la bien-aimée (1944),
 Le Souffle (1952), Prix Femina
 Les Quatre coins (1954)
 Artémis (1958)
 Le Lit (1960)
 Maintenant (1967)
 Le Corps (1969)
 Les Éclairs (1971)
 Lettre au vieil homme (1973)
 L’Enragé (1978)
 L’Infini chez soi (1980)
 L’Enfant-roi (1986)
 Trente ans d’amour fou (1988)
 Vingt chambres d’hôtel (1990)
 L’Accoudoir (1996)
 La Rénovation (1998)
 Journal amoureux (2000), novel
 Le Futur immédiat (2001), novel
 Plaisirs (2001),
 Lettre à Lise (2003)

Awards
 Prix Femina, (1952), for Le Souffle.
 Franz Hellens prijs, (1978), for L'Enragé.
 Prix Kléber Haedens, (1980), for L’Infini chez soi.
 Prix Roland Jouvenel of the Académie française, (1990), for Vingt chambres d’hôtel.
 Prix Thyde Monnier, (1991), entire œuvre.
 Grand prix national des Lettres, (2001), entire oeuvre.

References 

People from Ixelles
1913 births
2012 deaths
French women novelists
Belgian women novelists
Women autobiographers
French feminists
Belgian feminists
20th-century French novelists
20th-century French women writers
20th-century Belgian novelists
Belgian autobiographers
Prix Femina winners
Prix France Culture winners